Jericho is an American espionage series set during World War II. The series stars John Leyton, Don Francks and Marino Masé as secret agents, and aired on CBS from September 1966 to January 1967.

Plot and production
Norman Felton who had previously co-produced The Man from U.N.C.L.E. came up with the idea of a World War II espionage series produced by his Arena Productions through Metro-Goldwyn-Mayer Television for the CBS television network. The characters were perhaps inspired by the Jedburgh teams consisting of three agents, American Office of Strategic Services Army Captain Franklin Shepphard (Francks) expert in psychological warfare,  Special Operations Executive Royal Navy Lieutenant Nicholas Gage (Leyton) expert in demolitions, and French Air Force Lt. Jean-Gaston Andre (Masé) skilled in small arms. Each week the three performed a mission behind enemy lines using their skills in espionage and sabotage where they met a guest star. Eric Braeden, who would be one of the stars of the more successful World War II series The Rat Patrol (which began that same season), was one of the guest stars in the pilot.

The Jericho theme was composed by Jerry Goldsmith, although Goldsmith did not score the pilot episode "Upbeat And Underground" (Lalo Schifrin composed the music for the pilot and a theme which was never used) - Goldsmith's theme came from his score for "A Jug Of Wine, A Loaf Of Bread And Pow!"

The series was canceled after 16 episodes. It primarily failed as it was shown opposite ABC's popular Batman.

Episodes

Soundtrack 
In June 2005, Film Score Monthly released an album of music from the series, twinned with the score Johnny Williams composed for the unsold pilot The Ghostbreaker (also produced by Arena Productions and Metro-Goldwyn-Mayer Television) - the latter score occupies tracks 13-22.

 Jericho Main Title - Jerry Goldsmith (1:04)
 A Jug of Wine, a Loaf of Bread, and Pow! - Jerry Goldsmith (10:52)
 Upbeat and Underground - Lalo Schifrin (8:47)
 Dutch and Go - Morton Stevens (4:38)
 Have Traitor, Will Travel - Morton Stevens (2:29)
 The Big Brass Contraband - Richard Shores (3:41)
 Wall to Wall Kaput - Richard Shores (2:07)
 Eric the Redhead - Gerald Fried (5:33)
 One for the Mountain - Richard Shores (3:16)
 Two for the Road - Richard Shores (4:49)
 Four O'clock Bomb to London - Richard Shores (4:29)
 Alternate Main Title - Lalo Schifrin (:45)
 The Ghostbreaker Main Title (1:01)
 Teaser (3:39)
 Act I: The Spooked Skyscraper Strikes Again (2:08)
 Men of Unitran (1:44)
 Act II: Accent the Supernatural (3:00)
 Greensleeves (1:24)
 Act III: Don't Trip Over Diablo (3:57)
 Organ Piece (2:31)
 Act IV: To Outspook a Spook (6:25)
 End Credits (:49)

DVD release
On June 16, 2015, Warner Bros. released Jericho- The Complete Series on DVD via their Warner Archive Collection.  This is a manufacture-on-demand (MOD) release, available through Warner's online store and Amazon.com.

Notes

External links
 

1966 American television series debuts
1967 American television series endings
1960s American drama television series
CBS original programming
English-language television shows
Espionage television series
American military television series
Television series based on actual events
Television series by MGM Television
World War II television drama series